Anika Bozicevic  (born 8 November 1972) is a Swedish footballer who played as a forward for the Sweden women's national football team. She was part of the team at the 1995 FIFA Women's World Cup. On club level she played for Malmö in Sweden. She is of Croatian heritage.

References

External links
 

1972 births
Living people
Swedish women's footballers
Sweden women's international footballers
Place of birth missing (living people)
1995 FIFA Women's World Cup players
Women's association football forwards
Swedish people of Croatian descent